British European Airways Flight S200P was a short-haul flight from London-Northolt Airport to Glasgow-Renfrew Airport, Scotland. On 21 April 1948, while on approach to Renfrew, a Vickers VC.1 Viking, registration G-AIVE, crashed into Irish Law Mountain in North Ayrshire, Scotland. No one died in the accident, but 13 of the 20 passengers and crew were injured, and the aircraft was damaged beyond repair.

Accident
Flight S200P had taken off 19:09 British Summer Time (18:09 GMT). After a one-hour flight, air traffic control at Glasgow-Renfrew cleared it for a standard beam approach into the airport. The last radio contact was at 20:01, when the crew requested confirmation that the outer marker was operative. As the aircraft neared the airport, it hit a hill nose-first and broke into 3 parts; the engine and the left wing also broke off. Although the plane burst into flames, all 20 passengers and crew escaped, and all survived. Thirteen people were injured in the accident.

Cause
An investigation into the crash found the cause to be pilot error. Failure to receive the outer marker beacon signal (probably due to a fault that had developed in the receiver) was a contributory factor.

Crash site today
Some remnants of G-AIVE remain on the hill at Irish Law Mountain, including the engines, landing gear, and parts of the left and right wings.

References

Notes

Bibliography
"B.E.A. Viking Accident Report". Flight, 18 November 1948, p. 596.
"Viking Crash in Scotland". Flight 29 April 1948, p. 463.

External links
Two photos of the wreckage
Aerial view of the area

 Air crash sites in Scotland

 Aviation Forum

Airliner accidents and incidents caused by pilot error
Aviation accidents and incidents in 1948
Aviation accidents and incidents in Scotland
Accidents and incidents involving the Vickers VC.1 Viking
Flight S200P
1948 disasters in the United Kingdom
April 1948 events in the United Kingdom